Willet is a town in Cortland County, New York, United States. The population was 1,043 at the 2010 census. The town is named after Colonel Marinus Willet. It is in the southeast corner of the county, southeast of the City of Cortland.

History 

Willet was within the former Central New York Military Tract. The area was first settled circa 1797.

Willet was created from a part of the town of Cincinnatus in 1818. In 1865, the population was 982.

Geography

The Otselic River flows southward through the town.

The eastern town line is the border of Chenango County, and the southern town boundary  is the border of Broome County.

New York State Route 26 intersects New York State Route 41 at Willet village. New York State Route 221 intersects the conjoined NY-26 and NY-41 west of the village.

Demographics

As of the census of 2000, there were 1,011 people, 368 households, and 281 families residing in the town.  The population density was 39.1 people per square mile (15.1/km2).  There were 525 housing units at an average density of 20.3 per square mile (7.8/km2).  The racial makeup of the town was 98.42% White, 0.20% Native American, 0.10% Asian, and 1.29% from two or more races.

There were 368 households, out of which 37.5% had children under the age of 18 living with them, 60.6% were married couples living together, 10.9% had a female householder with no husband present, and 23.4% were non-families. 18.2% of all households were made up of individuals, and 6.8% had someone living alone who was 65 years of age or older.  The average household size was 2.75 and the average family size was 3.06.

In the town, the population was spread out, with 29.4% under the age of 18, 7.0% from 18 to 24, 29.7% from 25 to 44, 23.3% from 45 to 64, and 10.6% who were 65 years of age or older.  The median age was 35 years. For every 100 females, there were 105.5 males.  For every 100 females age 18 and over, there were 104.0 males.

The median income for a household in the town was $35,893, and the median income for a family was $37,500. Males had a median income of $28,274 versus $21,932 for females. The per capita income for the town was $15,552.  About 9.2% of families and 12.9% of the population were below the poverty line, including 17.1% of those under age 18 and 9.8% of those age 65 or over.

Communities and locations in Willet 
Burlingame's Mills – A former location in the town east of Willet village.
Georgetown – A hamlet east of Willet village on NY-41.
Lakeview – A hamlet at the eastern town line on NY-41.
Landers Corners – A location in the southwestern part of the town on NY-26.
Penelope – A hamlet at the southern town line.
Stump Pond – A small lake south of Georgetown.
Willet – A hamlet in the northern part of the town at the junction of NY-26 and NY-41.

References

External links
 Town of Willet at Cortland County website
  Early history of Willet, NY
  Information about Willet

Towns in Cortland County, New York